Daniel K. Brown is a New Zealand-based American architect and academic. He is best known for his research on allegorical and speculative architecture. Brown holds the inaugural chair Professor of Design Studio at Victoria University of Wellington School of Architecture in New Zealand.

Career

Architectural career 

From 1982 to 1989, Brown worked at Newman Architects in New Haven, CT (1982-1983), Brown Daltas and Partners in Rome (1984-1985), Harry Seidler and Associates in Sydney (1986-1989), and Richard Meier and Partners in New York (1989-1990). He obtained his professional architectural registration in 1991 in New York. From 1990 to 1996 Brown was vice-president of the Emilio Ambasz and Associates (EAA).

Academic career 

In 1997 Brown was awarded a nine-month American Institute of Indian Studies Fellowship to study narrative architecture in India, followed by a three-month Asian Cultural Council Fellowship in Nepal and a nine-month Fulbright Fellowship in Thailand. In 1998 he was hired to teach architectural design at the Victoria University of Wellington in New Zealand. During his academic career, Brown has won 12 teaching awards, including the Award for Sustained Excellence in Tertiary Teaching. Brown has been awarded seven fully funded international research fellowships, three national research fellowships, and 16 professional awards for collaborative designs. He has held numerous academic leadership roles, including Associate Dean (Academic), Deputy Head of School, and Program Director.

In 2010, a 5-year retrospective of Brown's collaborative research with New York artist Kristin Jones was exhibited at the prestigious Venice Biennale of Architecture in the host Italy Pavilion as part of the exhibition "Reflections of the Future", curated by Luca Molinari, one of Italy's leading curators. The Italy Pavilion selected architectural research specifically responding to its theme: "work that unveils a vision of architecture as civil art capable of generating solutions for a society in the midst of deep-seated change."

In 2021, Brown was one of 12 academics worldwide selected to be featured in the London journal Architectural Design in the August 2021 special edition Emerging Talents: Training Architects.

References 

Living people
Academic staff of the Victoria University of Wellington